Rolf Bock (5 February 1937 – 17 January 2022) was a German football manager who managed Borussia Dortmund and Rot-Weiss Essen.

References

1937 births
2022 deaths
German football managers
Borussia Dortmund managers
Bundesliga managers
Rot-Weiss Essen managers
Borussia Dortmund non-playing staff
West German footballers
West German football managers